Battambang ("Lost Stick") is a province of Cambodia in the far northwest of the country. Bordering provinces are Banteay Meanchey to the north, Pursat to the east and south, Siem Reap to the northeast, and Pailin to the west. The northern and southern extremes of the province's western boundaries form part of the international border with Thailand. In addition, Tonlé Sap forms part of the northeastern boundary between Siem Reap and Pursat. Its capital and largest city is Battambang.

It is the fifth most populous province in Cambodia. In land area, Battambang is the fifth largest province of Cambodia. Battambang is one of the provinces included in the Tonle Sap Biosphere Reserve. The province's fertile rice fields have led to a mostly agricultural economy giving rise to the moniker "the rice bowl of Cambodia". The province features a range of cultures as well as natural resources. Seventy five percent of the area is jungles and mountains. The area has a tropical climate.

Etymology

Battambang literally means 'loss of staff or stick' in Khmer, referring to the local legend of Preah Bat Dambang Kranhoung. No stone inscriptions from the pre-Angkorian and Angkorian eras have yet been discovered containing mention of any contemporary villages or districts called "Battambang", but according to the document Mohachun Khmer, Srok Battambang (Battambang District) was used during the Angkor and post-Angkor eras. In Thai, the province is called Phra Tabong.

History
Battambang was annexed by both Siam and Cambodia from time to time because its location is in between both kingdoms. A majority of the local population is of Khonpor or Chong ethnicity, a part of the Austro-Asiatic family.

In 1769, Battambang and Siem Reap were conquered by King Taksin of Siam. On March 23, 1907, Battambang, with Siem Reap and Koh Kong, were annexed to French Indochina. During World War II it was annexed to Imperial Japan before being handed over to Thailand. After the war ended, it was returned to an independent Cambodia.

Administrative divisions
Battambang is divided into 13 districts and one municipality which are further subdivided into 92 communes (khum), 10 quarters and 810 villages (phum).

Local government entities within the province include the two towns and 12 subdistrict municipalities.

Historical sites

Wat Ek Phnom
Wat Ek Phnom is a partly collapsed 11th century temple 11 km north of Battambang city. The temple measures 52 m by 49 m and is surrounded by the remains of a laterite wall and an ancient baray (reservoir). A lintel depicting the Churning of the Ocean of Milk is above the east entrance to the central temple, the upper flanks of which hold some finely carved bas-reliefs. Construction of an oversized Buddha statue began by locals next to the temple has been stopped by the government because, they say, it mars the site’s historical provenance and "timeless beauty".

Wat Banan
Wat Banan, some 25 km south of Battambang city, has been likened to a smaller version of the more imposing Angkor Wat. The 11th century Angkorian mountain ruin of Phnom Banan is one of the best preserved Angkorian Khmer temples around Battambang province. As you approach you will see the distance five tower pointing skyward, Like a small version of Angkor Wat. At the base of the mountain you can faced with a step laterite staircase flanked by nagas. After climbing the 350+ steps you are treated to a wonderfully peaceful setting.

Transportation 
Battambang is accessible by road, and by boat via the Sangkae River. National Highway 5 runs straight through the province. Both the airport and railway line are not in use. Buses make 5-6 hour journey from Phnom Penh and the 3-4 hour journey from Siem Reap almost hourly.

References

External links
Battambang - The Rice Bowl of Cambodia (Official Website of the Provincial Town Battambang on www.battambang-town.gov.kh) 
Battambang Provincial Resources

 
Provinces of Cambodia